Manny Pacquiao vs. Antonio Margarito, was a super welterweight fight for the vacant WBC super welterweight championship. The bout was held on November 13, 2010, at AT&T Stadium, in Arlington, Texas, United States. The match was put together after the second negotiation for the long-awaited "superfight" between Manny Pacquiao and Floyd Mayweather Jr. had failed. Pacquiao defeated Margarito by unanimous decision.

Results

Despite his smaller size (5'5" vs Margarito's 5'11") and lower weight (148 lbs vs. Margarito's 165 lbs) Pacquiao hammered Margarito with his superior speed and technique. Margarito sustained three cuts, prompting Pacquiao to ask the referee, Laurence Cole, to stop the fight. Ringside commentators agreed as well that the fight should have been stopped.

The fight went the distance with Pacquiao winning via unanimous decision over Margarito. Pacquiao almost knocked out Margarito in the 4th round with a left hook to the body and in the 6th round Margarito connected a solid left hook to the body that sent Pacquiao into the ropes, which was the closest Margarito came to pressing Pacquiao. Judges' scores were Juergen Langos 120–108, Glen Rick Crocker 118–110, and Oren Shellenberger 119–109 in favor of Pacquiao. Pacquiao landed 474 out of 1069 punches (44%) while Margarito landed 229 out of 817 (28%). Out of those punches Pacquiao landed 411/713 power punches thrown (58%) while Margarito landed 135 out of 312 (43%).

Due to his injuries, Margarito's post-fight interview was skipped and he was sent directly to the hospital after the fight. Margarito had to undergo surgery as it was discovered that his right orbital bone had been fractured.

In the post-fight interview, Pacquiao was asked if he held back during the last round, and Pacquiao said he just let the 3 minutes run out and that "Boxing is not for killing". Pacquiao also stated "I did not want to damage him permanently." It would turn out, unfortunately, that the fight did leave permanent damage to the right eye of Margarito. This eye almost lost him his license to fight upon a medical inspection. During Margarito's next and final bout against Miguel Cotto, his eye suffered severe swelling and caused him to lose the bout via doctor/referee stoppage.

The fight generated 1.15 million buys and 64 million dollars in revenue and the attendance was 41,734.

Televised
Super Welterweight bout:  Manny Pacquiao vs.  Antonio Margarito
Pacquiao defeated Margarito via unanimous decision (120–108, 118–110, 119–109).
Welterweight bout:  Jesus Soto Karass vs.  Mike Jones
Jones defeated Karass via majority decision (97–93, 95–94, 94–94).
Super Bantamweight bout:  Guillermo Rigondeaux vs.  Ricardo Cordoba
Rigondeaux defeated Cordoba via split decision (117–109, 114–112, 112–114).
Lightweight bout:  Brandon Rios vs.  Omri Lowther
Rios defeated Lowther via TKO at 2:35 of fifth round.

Televised free
Featherweight bout:  Roberto Marroquin vs.  Francisco Dominguez
Marroquin defeated Dominguez via knockout at 1:27 of first round.
Light Welterweight bout:  José Benavidez vs.  Winston Mathis
Benavidez defeated Mathis via knockout at 2:23 of third round.
Light Heavyweight bout:  Mike Lee vs.  Keith Debow
Lee defeated Debow via knockout at 1:33 of first round.
Light Welterweight bout:  Oscar Meza vs.  Jose Hernandez
Meza defeated Hernandez via unanimous decision (38–37, 38–37, 39–36).
Flyweight bout:  Richie Mepranum vs.  Anthony Villarreal
Mepranum defeated Villarreal via split decision.
Lightweight bout:  Juan Martin Elorde vs.  Angel Rodriguez
Rodriguez defeated Elorde via unanimous decision (40–36, 40–36, 39–37).
Welterweight bout:  Dennis Laurente vs.  Rashad Holloway
Laurente defeated Holloway via unanimous decision (77–75, 79–73, 78–74).

International broadcasting

References

Margarito
2010 in boxing
Boxing in Texas
Sports in Arlington, Texas
21st century in Arlington, Texas
2010 in sports in Texas
November 2010 sports events in the United States
Boxing on HBO
Events in Arlington, Texas